Robert II (Rodbert, Chrodobert) (died 12 July 807) was a Frankish nobleman who was count of Worms and of Rheingau and count of Hesbaye around the year 800. 

It has been proposed that he is the father of Robert III of Worms, and the earliest-known male-line ancestor of the French royal family, the so-called Capetians (including the Valois and the Bourbons), and of other royal families which ruled in Portugal, Spain, Luxembourg, Parma, Brazil and the Kingdom of the Two Sicilies.

Possible ancestry
Robert was probably the son of Thuringbert of Worms and Rheingau, and thus a grandson of Robert I, Duke of Neustria (c. 697–748). An alternate theory has him as the son of Robert, son of Thuringbert.

It is also possible that Ingerman of Hesbaye and Cancor were the brothers of Robert of Hesbaye, and Landrada, mother of Saint Chrodegang, archbishop of Metz, is likely to have been his sister. Ermengarde, the wife of emperor Louis the Pious, was probably his niece.

Sources
Settipani, Christian, Les Ancêtres de Charlemagne, 2e édition revue et corrigée, éd. P & G, Prosopographia et Genealogica, 2015
Settipani, Christian. Addenda aux "Ancêtres de Charlemagne, 1990
Riché, Pierre, The Carolingians: a family who forged Europe

807 deaths
Robertians
Counts of Hesbaye
Year of birth unknown
Year of death unknown